Baranovka is the name of several  rural localities in Russia.

Altai Krai
As of 2010, one rural locality in Altai Krai bears this name:
Baranovka, Altai Krai, a selo in Baranovsky Selsoviet of Zmeinogorsky District

Astrakhan Oblast
As of 2010, four rural localities in Astrakhan Oblast bear this name:
Baranovka, Chernoyarsky District, Astrakhan Oblast, a selo in Chernoyarsky Selsoviet of Chernoyarsky District
Baranovka, Krasnoyarsky District, Astrakhan Oblast, a settlement in Yubileyninsky Selsoviet of Krasnoyarsky District
Baranovka, Narimanovsky District, Astrakhan Oblast, a selo in Baranovsky Selsoviet of Narimanovsky District
Baranovka, Volodarsky District, Astrakhan Oblast, a selo in Kalininsky Selsoviet of Volodarsky District

Bryansk Oblast
As of 2010, three rural localities in Bryansk Oblast bear this name:
Baranovka, Karachevsky District, Bryansk Oblast, a village in Pervomaysky Selsoviet of Karachevsky District
Baranovka, Rognedinsky District, Bryansk Oblast, a village in Sharovichsky Selsoviet of Rognedinsky District
Baranovka, Zlynkovsky District, Bryansk Oblast, a village in Kozhanovsky Selsoviet of Zlynkovsky District

Chelyabinsk Oblast
As of 2010, one rural locality in Chelyabinsk Oblast bears this name:
Baranovka, Chelyabinsk Oblast, a village in Shakhmatovsky Selsoviet of Chebarkulsky District

Kaluga Oblast
As of 2010, four rural localities in Kaluga Oblast bear this name:
Baranovka, Babyninsky District, Kaluga Oblast, a village in Babyninsky District
Baranovka, Khvastovichsky District, Kaluga Oblast, a village in Khvastovichsky District
Baranovka, Maloyaroslavetsky District, Kaluga Oblast, a village in Maloyaroslavetsky District
Baranovka, Yukhnovsky District, Kaluga Oblast, a village in Yukhnovsky District

Kemerovo Oblast
As of 2010, one rural locality in Kemerovo Oblast bears this name:
Baranovka, Kemerovo Oblast, a selo in Shcheglovskaya Rural Territory of Kemerovsky District

Kirov Oblast
As of 2010, one rural locality in Kirov Oblast bears this name:
Baranovka, Kirov Oblast, a settlement under the administrative jurisdiction of the Town of Kirs in Verkhnekamsky District

Kostroma Oblast
As of 2010, one rural locality in Kostroma Oblast bears this name:
Baranovka, Kostroma Oblast, a village in Shangskoye Settlement of Sharyinsky District

Krasnodar Krai
As of 2010, two rural localities in Krasnodar Krai bear this name:
Baranovka, Khostinsky City District, Sochi, Krasnodar Krai, a selo in Baranovsky Rural Okrug under the jurisdiction of Khostinsky City District of the City of Sochi
Baranovka, Lazarevsky City District, Sochi, Krasnodar Krai, a selo in Volkovsky Rural Okrug under the jurisdiction of Lazarevsky City District of the City of Sochi

Kurgan Oblast
As of 2010, one rural locality in Kurgan Oblast bears this name:
Baranovka, Kurgan Oblast, a village in Karasinsky Selsoviet of Yurgamyshsky District

Lipetsk Oblast
As of 2010, three rural localities in Lipetsk Oblast bear this name:
Baranovka, Dankovsky District, Lipetsk Oblast, a village in Balovnevsky Selsoviet of Dankovsky District
Baranovka, Izmalkovsky District, Lipetsk Oblast, a village in Domovinsky Selsoviet of Izmalkovsky District
Baranovka, Yeletsky District, Lipetsk Oblast, a village in Fedorovsky Selsoviet of Yeletsky District

Republic of Mordovia
As of 2010, two rural localities in the Republic of Mordovia bear this name:
Baranovka, Atyuryevsky District, Republic of Mordovia, a village in Atyuryevsky Selsoviet of Atyuryevsky District
Baranovka, Krasnoslobodsky District, Republic of Mordovia, a village in Starogoryashinsky Selsoviet of Krasnoslobodsky District

Moscow Oblast
As of 2010, one rural locality in Moscow Oblast bears this name:
Baranovka, Moscow Oblast, a village in Akatyevskoye Rural Settlement of Kolomensky District

Nizhny Novgorod Oblast
As of 2010, one rural locality in Nizhny Novgorod Oblast bears this name:
Baranovka, Nizhny Novgorod Oblast, a settlement in Naryshkinsky Selsoviet of Voznesensky District

Oryol Oblast
As of 2010, one rural locality in Oryol Oblast bears this name:
Baranovka, Oryol Oblast, a village in Koshelevsky Selsoviet of Sverdlovsky District

Perm Krai
As of 2010, two rural localities in Perm Krai bear this name:
Baranovka, Kungursky District, Perm Krai, a village in Kungursky District
Baranovka, Yelovsky District, Perm Krai, a village in Yelovsky District

Pskov Oblast
As of 2010, two rural localities in Pskov Oblast bear this name:
Baranovka, Gdovsky District, Pskov Oblast, a village in Gdovsky District
Baranovka, Pskovsky District, Pskov Oblast, a village in Pskovsky District

Ryazan Oblast
As of 2010, two rural localities in Ryazan Oblast bear this name:
Baranovka, Mikhaylovsky District, Ryazan Oblast, a village in Malinkovsky Rural Okrug of Mikhaylovsky District
Baranovka, Miloslavsky District, Ryazan Oblast, a village in Gornyatsky Rural Okrug of Miloslavsky District

Saratov Oblast
As of 2010, two rural localities in Saratov Oblast bear this name:
Baranovka, Atkarsky District, Saratov Oblast, a selo in Atkarsky District
Baranovka, Volsky District, Saratov Oblast, a selo in Volsky District

Smolensk Oblast
As of 2010, three rural localities in Smolensk Oblast bear this name:
Baranovka, Monastyrshchinsky District, Smolensk Oblast, a village in Lyubavichskoye Rural Settlement of Monastyrshchinsky District
Baranovka, Pochinkovsky District, Smolensk Oblast, a village in Klimshchinskoye Rural Settlement of Pochinkovsky District
Baranovka, Tyomkinsky District, Smolensk Oblast, a village in Medvedevskoye Rural Settlement of Tyomkinsky District

Tambov Oblast
As of 2010, two rural localities in Tambov Oblast bear this name:
Baranovka, Petrovsky District, Tambov Oblast, a village in Volchkovsky Selsoviet of Petrovsky District
Baranovka, Tokaryovsky District, Tambov Oblast, a village in Bezukladovsky Selsoviet of Tokaryovsky District

Tula Oblast
As of 2010, four rural localities in Tula Oblast bear this name:
Baranovka, Arkhangelsky Rural Okrug, Kamensky District, Tula Oblast, a village in Arkhangelsky Rural Okrug of Kamensky District
Baranovka, Sitovsky Rural Okrug, Kamensky District, Tula Oblast, a village in Sitovsky Rural Okrug of Kamensky District
Baranovka, Kimovsky District, Tula Oblast, a village in Baranovsky Rural Okrug of Kimovsky District
Baranovka, Kurkinsky District, Tula Oblast, a village in Samarskaya Volost of Kurkinsky District

Tver Oblast
As of 2010, one rural locality in Tver Oblast bears this name:
Baranovka, Tver Oblast, a village in Likhoslavlsky District

Ulyanovsk Oblast
As of 2010, one rural locality in Ulyanovsk Oblast bears this name:
Baranovka, Ulyanovsk Oblast, a selo in Baranovsky Rural Okrug of Nikolayevsky District

Vladimir Oblast
As of 2010, one rural locality in Vladimir Oblast bears this name:
Baranovka, Vladimir Oblast, a village in Kolchuginsky District

Volgograd Oblast
As of 2010, two rural localities in Volgograd Oblast bear this name:
Baranovka, Kamyshinsky District, Volgograd Oblast, a selo in Petruninsky Selsoviet of Kamyshinsky District
Baranovka, Nikolayevsky District, Volgograd Oblast, a khutor in Baranovsky Selsoviet of Nikolayevsky District